Gyan Bharati Vidyalaya is one of the best English and Hindi medium & co-education school of North Kolkata ( Calcutta ). The school is located at 64 Nimtalla Ghat Street.

"Gyan Bharati Society", which was established on 24. 12. 1959, is a well-known organization of North Kolkata. Spread of quality education has been its primary goal. Gyan Bharati has, under its fold, four units namely

• Gyan Bharati Vidyapith (Class V to XII ),
• Gyan Bharati Balika Vidyalaya (Class V to XII),
• Gyan Bharati Prathamik Vidyalaya (Class Lower I to IV ) and
• Gyan Bharati Vidyalaya - English Medium (Class Lower KG to X )

While for the last unit the medium of instruction is English, for the other three units both Hindi and English Mediums are offered. Gyan Bharati Vidyalaya (English Medium) and Gyan Bharati Prathamik Vidyalaya are co-educational schools. Details of each of the four schools have been furnished in different sections of this Website.

History
The school was established in 1959 and is affiliated to the West Bengal Board of Secondary Education for Madhyamik Pariksha, and to the West Bengal Council of Higher Secondary Education for Higher Secondary Examination.

See also
Education in India
List of schools in India
Education in West Bengal

References

External links 
 

High schools and secondary schools in West Bengal
Schools in Kolkata
Educational institutions established in 1959
1959 establishments in West Bengal